Kurt Ranke (14 April 1908 – 6 June 1985) was a German ethnologist who specialized in the study of fairy tales.

Biography
Kurt Ranke was born in Blankenburg, Germany on 14 April 1908. His father was a postal inspector. Growing up in Essen, Ranke studied Germanistics, ethnology and history at the universities of Bonn and Munich from 1927 to 1930. Ranke subsequently transferred to the University of Kiel, where he in 1933 gained a PhD on fairy tales under the supervision of Karl Wesle. He completed his habilitation on comparative religion, ethnology and ancient history in 1938 at Kiel under the supervision of Wesle. His habilitation thesis centered on the cult of the dead in Indo-European religion.

After gaining his habilitation, Ranke lectured at Kiel on ethnology and ancient history, but was drafted into the Wehrmacht during World War II. In 1951 he resumed lecturing at Kiel. He began publishing the Encyclopedia of Fairy Tales in 1957, and founded the journal Fabula in 1958, of which he served as editor. In 1958 he was appointed an associate professor at Kiel. Ranke co-founded the International Society for Folk Narrative Research in 1959, serving as its first President, and appointed its Honorary President in 1974.

In 1960, Ranke succeeded Will Erich Peuckert as Professor and Chair of Ethnology at the University of Göttingen. Ranke played a leading role in the publishing of the second edition of the Reallexikon der Germanischen Altertumskunde, and was a co-editor of several of its volumes. He was also an editor of Folklore Fellows’ Communications.

Ranke retired from the University of Göttingen in 1973. He was elected a Member of the Göttingen Academy of Sciences and Humanities in 1977. He died in Stadensen, West Germany on 6 June 1985.

Selected works
 Die zwei Brüder. Eine Studie zur vergleichenden Märchenforschung, 1934
 Indogermanische Totenverehrung, 1951
 Schleswig-holsteinische Volksmärchen, 1955-1962
 Die Welt der einfachen Formen, 1978

See also
 Jost Trier
 Otto Höfler

References

Sources

Further reading

 Fritz Harkort, Karel C. Peeters, Robert Wildhaber (eds.:): Volksüberlieferung. Festschrift für Kurt Ranke zur Vollendung des 60. Lebensjahres. Göttingen 1968.
 Rolf Wilhelm Brednich: Kurt Ranke zum 75. Geburtstag. Wissenschaftliche Bilanz der letzten Jahre. In: Fabula 24, 1983, pp. 1–3
 Elfriede Moser-Rath: Kurt Ranke und sein Göttinger Team. In: Fabula 24, 1983, pp. 8–10.
 Stefaan Top: In memoriam Prof. Dr. Kurt Ranke (1908–1985). In: Volkskunde 86, 1985, p. 254
 Lauri Honko: Kurt Ranke 1908–1985. In: NIF Newsletter 13,4, 1985, p. 15
 Hannelore Jeske: Sammler und Sammlungen von Volkserzählungen in Schleswig-Holstein, Neumünster 2002, pp. 166–170 .
 
 Hans-Jörg Uther: Die Enzyklopädie des Märchens. Ein Jahrhundertprojekt vor dem Abschluss. In: Arbeitskreis Bild, Druck, Papier. Tagungsband Graz 2015. Münster u. a. 2016, pp. 142–148.

1908 births
1985 deaths
Fairy tale scholars
German ethnologists
German military personnel of World War II
German philologists
Germanic studies scholars
Germanists
Indo-Europeanists
Ludwig Maximilian University of Munich alumni
People from Blankenburg (Harz)
University of Bonn alumni
Academic staff of the University of Göttingen
University of Kiel alumni
Academic staff of the University of Kiel
20th-century philologists